Nikolay Mikhailovich Matveyev (May 22, 1877, village Bogdat, Nerchinsko-Zavodsky uezd, Transbaikal – April 26, 1951, Moscow) was a Russian Soviet politician and revolutionary who was the second and last president of the Far Eastern Republic.

He was graduated from the Irkutsk Officer Cadet School and worked as a land surveyor for the Transbaikal Cossack Host. After the Russian Revolution of 1917 Matveyev was appointed a deputy of the commissar on Military Affairs. In February 1918 he headed the Soviet Narkom of the Interior. In the summer of 1918 Matveyev joined the Siberian Soviet Narkom. After the fall of the Soviets in Siberia he was forced to hide in taiga in which he was caught and arrested by the Whites.

Matveyev was released in February 1920 and appointed as the head of the political department of the Amur Partisan Army. Matveyev joined the Far Eastern Republic's Government in December 1920. He was the War Minister and in December 1921 he became the last head of the Republic. After the "reunion" of the RSFSR and the Far Eastern Republic in 1922 Matveyev served in many Soviet posts until his death.

References
Matveyev, N. M., Transbaikal Encyclopedia. Accessed January 2010.
Sergeĭ Spiridonovich Khromov (Editor), Civil war and military intervention in USSR: encyclopedia,, Moscow, 1983

1877 births
1951 deaths
People from Zabaykalsky Krai
People from Transbaikal Oblast
Russian Social Democratic Labour Party members
Old Bolsheviks
Communist Party of the Soviet Union members
Government ministers of the Far Eastern Republic
Soviet military personnel of the Russian Civil War